Acianthera chionopa is a species of epiphytic orchid native to Colombia and Ecuador.

References 

chionopa
Epidendroideae
Flora of Ecuador

Flora of Colombia
Orchids of Ecuador
Orchids of Colombia
Plants described in 1980